Animal Charity Evaluators (ACE), formerly known as Effective Animal Activism (EAA), is a US-based charity evaluator and effective altruism-focused nonprofit founded in 2012. ACE evaluates animal charities and compares the effectiveness of their different campaigns and strategies. The organization makes charity recommendations to donors once a year. Its stated purpose is finding and promoting the most effective ways to help animals.

History 
Animal Charity Evaluators was formed in 2012 as Effective Animal Activism, a division of 80,000 Hours, by the Centre for Effective Altruism. It rebranded as Animal Charity Evaluators in 2013. Australian philosopher Peter Singer sits on the organization's advisory board.

Recommendations 
ACE publishes its recommended charities once a year in November, ahead of Giving Tuesday. In 2022, ACE's "top charities" recommended for impact and effectiveness were The Humane League (for the eleventh consecutive year), Wild Animal Initiative (for the third year), and Faunalytics (for the second year). 

They also re-listed the Good Food Institute (GFI) as a top charity, after a one-year hiatus due to reports of workplace toxicity. GFI employees had reported to ACE that they feared retaliation from openly disagreeing with GFI leaders. ACE stated that since the last review, leadership had ameliorated the situation by implementing various trainings, and that based on this information, ACE believed they were "working on addressing these situations." GFI had previously been recommended as a top charity for five years, which was every year since its foundation.

In addition to the top charities, the Evaluators also recommend a longer list of "standout charities" each year.

Reception 
Marc Gunther reviewed ACE in a 2015 article for Nonprofit Chronicles, stating: "[T]he work of Animal Charity Evaluators (ACE) is relevant to nonprofits of all kinds. As its name suggests and, on a very modest budget, ACE evaluates animal charities. Its work could inspire those who want to evaluate charities in other sectors—education, the environment, that arts, whatever." He further noted: "The point is, Animal Charity Evaluators is asking the right questions–the kind all nonprofits should be asking themselves."

Peter Singer mentions ACE's work in his 2015 book The Most Good You Can Do and in an online article for Salon. He describes their recommendations as a form of "altruistic arbitrage", picking the low-hanging fruits of animal activism, which he describes as worth supporting.

In 2017, Harrison Nathan and the animal rights group SHARK criticised ACE, suggesting they were biased in favour of charities associated with one charity founder, Nick Cooney. Nathan and ACE engaged in an exchange of open letters and responses.

See also
 List of animal rights groups
 List of animal welfare organizations

References

External links 
 

2012 establishments in California
501(c)(3) organizations
American review websites
Animal welfare organizations based in the United States
Centre for Effective Altruism
Charity review websites
Non-profit organizations based in California
Organizations established in 2012